Patriarch Nicholas II may refer to:

 Patriarch Nicholas II of Antioch, ruled in 860–879
 Nicholas II of Constantinople, Ecumenical Patriarch in 984–996
 Patriarch Nicholas II of Alexandria, Greek Patriarch of Alexandria in 1263–1276